The Hanko–Hyvinkää Railroad, 1872–1875, was Finland's first privately funded railway.

Hanko  is the southernmost town in Finland. Hanko has a seaport which, thanks to its location, can be used for the longest possible time during the sometimes very severe, and freezing, Finnish winters. Because all the other Finnish seaports might be frozen solid during the winter, there was an anticipation for a large amount freight transit traffic.  As such, a decision was made to privately fund the  railway from Hanko to the Finnish State Railways' Helsinki–Hämeenlinna line, with the connection at Hyvinkää.

Work on the new railway began in 1872 with the inaugural run being on October 8, 1873. Owing to insufficient funds, the private company soon got into financial trouble.  Facing almost certain liquidation, the  railroad company was sold to the Finnish State Railways in 1875. Today, the Finnish Railway Museum is based at the site of the original roundhouse and Hyvinkää railway station buildings in the town of Hyvinkää.

Motive power
As the first private railway company in Finland, the railroad company obtained nine "American style" Baldwin 4-4-0 steam locomotives, in addition to four engines of European manufacture.

Current services
VR Group currently operates passenger services between Hanko and Karis, with commuter services from Karis to Helsinki Central Station. However, the section between Karis and Hyvinkää is freight-only.

See also
 History of rail transport in Finland
 Finnish Railway Museum
 List of Finnish locomotives

External links
Old photos from the Hanko station and roundhouse
Finnish Railway Museum
Website about the Hanko–Hyvinkää 4-4-0 locomotives, including a full drawing of a Baldwin 4-4-0, drafted in the Hanko workshop in 1875.
Steam Locomotives in Finland Including the Finnish Railway Museum

Railway lines in Finland
Railway lines opened in 1873
5 ft gauge railways in Finland